Khair Muhammad Jalandhari (1895 - 1970) (Urdu: مولانا خير محمّد جالندھرى) was a Pakistani Islamic scholar, founder and first rector Jamia Khairul Madaris. He served as president and vice-president of Wifaq ul Madaris Al-Arabia, Pakistan.

Early life and education
Khair Muhammad Jalandhari was born in 1895 to Elahi Bakhsh in Nakodar, Jalandhar district India. He completed the Quran from Mian Imam Din and his maternal uncle Shah Muhammad. In 1905, he went to Madrasa Rasheedia in Nakodar and studied initial Persian books there. Then he continued his education at Madrasa Arabi Raipur, Madrasa Sabria Raipur in Gojran and Madrasa Manba ul Uloom Gulauthi, Bulandshahr. He joined Madarsa Isha Atul Uloom Bareilly in 1913 and graduated in traditional dars-e-nizami in 1917. There he studied under Muhammad Yasin Sirhindi, a student of Mahmud Hasan Deobandi.

Jalandhari was a disciple of Ashraf Ali Thanwi. He also served as a member of the governing body of Darul Uloom Deoband in May 1944 to 1947.

Literary work
 Khair Ul Usool Fi Hadith Ur Rasool 
 Aasar-e-Khair 
 Khair ul Fatawa

References

Bibliography
 

1895 births
1975 deaths
Pakistani Islamic religious leaders
Pakistani Sunni Muslim scholars of Islam
Presidents of Wifaq ul Madaris Al-Arabia
Muslim missionaries
People from Jalandhar
Deobandis
Vice presidents of Wifaq ul Madaris Al-Arabia
Disciples of Ashraf Ali Thanwi
Jamia Khairul Madaris people